Pine Valley (Provo River), is a valley along the North Fork of the Provo River in Summit and Wasatch counties in north or north-central Utah, United States. The former Stewart Ranch, which includes five buildings listed on the National Register of Historic Places, runs along it.

References

Landforms of Summit County, Utah
Landforms of Wasatch County, Utah
Valleys of Utah